Clémence Beikes (born October 19, 1983 in Grande-Synthe) is a French female professional basketball player. She plays for France women's national basketball team. She competed at the 2012 Summer Olympics, winning a silver medal.

References

French women's basketball players
1983 births
Living people
Olympic basketball players of France
Basketball players at the 2012 Summer Olympics
Olympic medalists in basketball
Olympic silver medalists for France
Medalists at the 2012 Summer Olympics
Knights of the Ordre national du Mérite